Paul James Hoffman (May 5, 1925 – November 12, 1998) was an American professional basketball player.

High school and college career
Hoffman, a 6'2" guard/forward, attended Jasper High School in Jasper, Indiana from 1939 to 1943; his coach was the legendary Cabby O'Neill. After high school, he attended Purdue University, where he played under head coach Ward Lambert. He became the only four time First Team-All Big Ten selection in Boilermaker history and one of the first two players to be selected in the NBA draft with teammate Bulbs Ehlers. He led Purdue in scoring all four seasons and won the MVP award for his performance in the 1947 All-American All-Star game at Madison Square Garden.  Hoffman was a three-time second team Helms Foundation All-American.

Professional playing career
Hoffman was drafted by the Toronto Huskies in the 1947 BAA draft, but never played for the team as it folded before the season began. He instead signed with the Baltimore Bullets, and averaged 10.5 points per game in his rookie season and was named NBA Rookie of the Year—a designation not sanctioned by the NBA for the 1947–48 season. The Bullets went on to win the 1948 BAA Finals and were crowned BAA champions. Hoffman wanted his salary raised following his successful debut season, but the team refused, so Hoffman left to return to Indiana and became a salesman at Montgomery Ward. Hoffman re-signed with the team for the 1949–50 season.

After playing for five seasons with the Bullets, the team disbanded in November 1954, fourteen games into the 1954–55 season. Hoffman was selected by the New York Knicks in the dispersal draft. He only played for the Knicks for less than two months before being sold to the Philadelphia Warriors. Hoffman retired from playing basketball after the season. He averaged 10.2 points, 2.9 assists and 5.1 rebounds over his career.

Coaching career
From 1956 to 1959, he was head baseball coach at Purdue, replacing Hank Stram; his career totals were 52–49–2 (.505) all games and 18–30–1 (.367) in Big Ten Conference games.  He was replaced as the head baseball coach by former Boilermaker star Joe Sexson. He also worked as an assistant for the basketball team under head coach Ray Eddy.

Later years
He served as general manager for the Baltimore Bullets. from June 1963 through May 1965; the Bullets recorded an overall record of 68–92 (.425) and reached the NBA Western Division Finals in the 1964–65 season.

In 1977, he was inducted into the Indiana Basketball Hall of Fame.  In 1993, at age 68, he was named to the named to the Indiana All-Stars, for the 1942–43 season.  The All-Stars, an all High School Senior team, are named at the conclusion of the school year; the team originated in 1939.  However, World War II, kept a team from being named and staging the annual 2-game series with the State of Kentucky.  The Indianapolis Star sponsored the team for decades and the Lions Club was the largest recipient of charitable donations from the series.

He died of a brain tumor at age 73 in 1998.

BAA/NBA career statistics

Regular season

Playoffs

References

External links

 Indiana Basketball Hall of Fame profile

1925 births
1998 deaths
All-American college men's basketball players
American men's basketball coaches
American men's basketball players
Baltimore Bullets (1944–1954) players
Basketball coaches from Indiana
Basketball players from Indiana
New York Knicks players
People from Jasper, Indiana
Philadelphia Warriors players
Purdue Boilermakers baseball coaches
Purdue Boilermakers men's basketball coaches
Purdue Boilermakers men's basketball players
Shooting guards
Small forwards
Toronto Huskies draft picks